Messageriella  is a genus of medium-sized air-breathing land snails, terrestrial pulmonate gastropod mollusks in the subfamily Phaedusinae  of the family Clausiliidae, the door snails, all of which have a clausilium.

Species
 Messageriella gargominyi Páll-Gergely & Szekeres, 2017
 Messageriella gregoi (Szekeres & Thach, 2017)

References

 Páll-Gergely B. & Szekeres M. (2017). New and little known Clausiliidae (Gastropoda: Pulmonata) from Laos and southern Vietnam. Journal of Conchology. 42(6): 507–521.

Clausiliidae